George Frederick Lindop MBE (20 July 1938 – January 2023) was a British rugby league referee. He refereed 22 test matches, including the World Cup Final in 1970. He also refereed five Challenge Cup Finals.

Lindop was appointed Member of the Order of the British Empire (MBE) in the 1989 New Year Honours for services to rugby league, and was inducted to the Rugby Football League's Roll of Honour in 2009.

Lindop also established the University of Sheffield rugby league team in 1969 and coached them. He coached junior rugby league at the Eastmoor club in Wakefield and the Oulton Raiders club near Leeds.

His death was announced on 23 January 2023, at the age of 84.

References

External links
 Alex Murphy v Fred Lindop - YouTube 
 Rugby League Roll of Honour - RFL

1938 births
2023 deaths
Rugby League World Cup referees
English rugby league referees
English rugby league coaches
Members of the Order of the British Empire
Sportspeople from Wakefield